HMS Zinnia may refer to the following ships of the Royal Navy:

 , an  sloop active during World War I; launched in August 1915; sold in 1920
 , a  active during World War II; launched in November 1940; sunk August 1941 by 

Royal Navy ship names